Jules Lucien André Bianchi (3 August 1989 – 17 July 2015) was a French motor racing driver who drove for the Marussia F1 Team in the FIA Formula One World Championship.

Bianchi had previously raced in Formula Renault 3.5, GP2 and Formula Three and was a Ferrari Driver Academy member. He entered Formula One as a practice driver in 2012 for Sahara Force India. In 2013, he made his debut driving for Marussia, finishing 15th in his opening race in Australia and ended the season in 19th position without having scored any points. In October 2013, the team confirmed that he would drive for the team the following season.

He underwent emergency surgery and was placed into an induced coma, and remained comatose until his death on 17 July 2015. Bianchi's death was the first to result from an on-track incident in Formula One in over 20 years, after Ayrton Senna's fatal accident at the 1994 San Marino Grand Prix. As of 2023, it is also the most recent fatal accident to have occurred in Formula One.

Personal life
Jules Bianchi was born in Nice, France, to Philippe and Christine Bianchi. He had two siblings, brother Tom and sister Mélanie, and had been the godfather of current Ferrari driver Charles Leclerc.

His favourite racing driver was Michael Schumacher.

Early career
Bianchi's exposure to motorsport started at around 3 years of age through karting and was facilitated by the fact that his father owned a kart track. Since age 17, Bianchi was professionally managed by Nicolas Todt.

Formula Renault 2.0
In 2007, Bianchi left karting and raced in French Formula Renault 2.0 for SG Formula, where he finished as champion with five wins. He also competed in the Formula Renault Eurocup where he had one pole position and one fastest lap in three races.

Formula 3 Euro

In late 2007, Bianchi signed with ART Grand Prix to compete in the Formula 3 Euro Series.

In 2008 Bianchi won the Masters of Formula 3 at Zolder, and also finished third in the 2008 Formula 3 Euro Series season.

Bianchi continued in the F3 Euroseries in 2009, leading ART's line-up along with rookie team-mates Valtteri Bottas, Esteban Gutiérrez and Adrien Tambay. With eight wins, Bianchi sealed the title with a round to spare, at Dijon-Prenois. He then added a ninth win at the final round at Hockenheim. He also drove in the Formula Renault 3.5 Series at Monaco, after SG Formula acquired the cars formerly run by Kurt Mollekens.

GP2

Bianchi drove for ART in the subsequent GP2 Asia season and the 2010 GP2 season. He competed in three of the four rounds of the GP2 Asia championship. In the main series, Bianchi took two pole positions and a number of points positions before he was injured in a first-lap crash at the Hungaroring. In the feature race, he spun into the path of the field exiting the first corner, and was struck head-on by Ho-Pin Tung, sustaining a fractured second lumbar vertebra in the process. Bianchi was fourth in the drivers' championship at the time of his injury. Despite initial pessimistic assessments of the severity of his injury, he recovered to take part in the next round of the championship.

Bianchi remained with ART for 2011, and was partnered by 2010 GP3 Series champion Esteban Gutiérrez. He starred in the first two rounds of the 2011 GP2 Asia Series, holding off Romain Grosjean for victory in the feature race and gaining fourth in the sprint race, but he was later penalised. He finished runner-up to Grosjean in the drivers' championship. In the main series, Bianchi finished third in the championship, behind Grosjean and Luca Filippi.

Formula Renault 3.5
Bianchi opted to switch to the Formula Renault 3.5 Series for 2012, following his one-off appearance in the category in 2009. He signed for the Tech 1 Racing team, and was partnered with Kevin Korjus, and later with Daniel Abt. He finished second in the title race, narrowly losing out to Robin Frijns at the final round.

Formula One career

Ferrari and Sahara Force India (test roles)
In August 2009, Bianchi was linked by the BBC and various other media sources to the second Ferrari Formula One seat occupied by Luca Badoer during Felipe Massa's absence. Bianchi tested for Ferrari at the young drivers test at Circuito de Jerez for two of the three days, over 1–2 December 2009. The other drivers tested on 3 December included Daniel Zampieri, Marco Zipoli and Pablo Sánchez López as the top three finishers in the 2009 Italian Formula Three Championship. Bianchi's performance in this test led to him becoming the first recruit of the Ferrari Driver Academy and signing up to a long-term deal to remain at the team's disposal.

On 11 November 2010 he was confirmed by Ferrari as the team's test and reserve driver for the  season, replacing Luca Badoer, Giancarlo Fisichella and Marc Gené, as well as confirming he would test for the team during the young driver test in Abu Dhabi over 16–17 November. Bianchi carried on his GP2 racing, as Formula 1 allows test and reserve drivers to race in parallel in other competitions. On 13 September 2011, Bianchi tested for Ferrari at Fiorano, as part of the Ferrari Driver Academy, with fellow academy member and Sauber F1 driver Sergio Pérez. Bianchi completed 70 laps and recorded a quickest lap time of 1:00.213. For the 2012 season, Ferrari loaned him to the Sahara Force India team, for whom he drove in nine Friday free practice sessions over the course of the year as the outfit's test and reserve driver.

Marussia F1

2013

On 1 March 2013, Marussia announced that Bianchi was to replace Luiz Razia as a race driver after Razia's contract was terminated, due to sponsorship issues. Bianchi overtook Pastor Maldonado, and Daniel Ricciardo on the first lap and he eventually finished 15th on his debut. He was 19th on the grid again in Malaysia, 0.3 seconds away from Q2. Bianchi fell behind the Caterhams at the start of the race, but moved up the order after the pit stops, eventually going on to finish 13th, ahead of his teammate, and both Caterhams. In the  he and Charles Pic of Caterham were given ten-place grid penalties for receiving three reprimands over the season, and at the race, his race ended early after a collision with Giedo van der Garde.

2014

In October 2013, Marussia confirmed that Bianchi would stay at the team for the following season.

Out of the nine races which Bianchi and Chilton completed without retiring, during the 2014 season, he was the quicker driver in eight of them, establishing his status as the first driver. Chilton retired twice, and Bianchi five times, with three of Bianchi's retirements being mechanical failures.

Days before his fatal accident, Bianchi declared himself "ready" to step into the Scuderia Ferrari race seat should the team need him amid the looming departure of Fernando Alonso.

2014 Suzuka accident

The 2014 Japanese Grand Prix was held on 5 October, under intermittent heavy rainfall caused by the approaching Typhoon Phanfone and in fading daylight.

On lap 43 of the race, Bianchi lost control of his car and veered right towards the run-off area on the outside of the Dunlop Curve (turn seven) of the Suzuka Circuit. He collided with the rear of a tractor crane tending to the removal of Adrian Sutil's Sauber after Sutil had spun out of control and crashed in the same area a lap before. Spectators' video footage and photographs of the accident revealed that the left side of Bianchi's Marussia car was extensively damaged and the roll bar destroyed as it slid under the tractor crane. The impact was such that the tractor crane was partially jolted off the ground causing Sutil's Sauber, which was suspended in the air by the crane, to fall back to the ground. The race was stopped and Lewis Hamilton was declared the winner.

Bianchi was reported as being unconscious after not responding to either a team radio call or marshals. He was treated  at the crash site before being taken by ambulance to the circuit's medical centre. Since transport by helicopter was not possible due to poor weather conditions, Bianchi was further transported by ambulance, for 32 minutes under police escort. Initial reports by his father, Philippe, to television channel France 3, were that Bianchi was in critical condition with a head injury and was undergoing an operation to reduce severe bruising to his head. The FIA subsequently said that CT scans showed Bianchi suffered a "severe head injury" in the crash, and that he would be admitted to intensive care following surgery.

Among his first hospital visitors immediately after the Grand Prix were Marussia's CEO Graeme Lowdon and team principal John Booth (the latter staying by Bianchi's side even after the inaugural Russian Grand Prix), as well as Ferrari's team principal Marco Mattiacci and fellow driver Felipe Massa.

Bianchi's parents arrived on 6 October and were joined, three days later, by their other children, Mélanie and Tom, as well as Jules' best friend, Lorenzo Leclerc. The family released a statement the next day, expressing appreciation for the outpouring of support from the public and for the presence of professor Gerard Saillant, president of the FIA Medical Commission, and professor Alessandro Frati, neurosurgeon of the Sapienza University of Rome, who travelled to Japan at the request of Scuderia Ferrari. They also provided a medical update, confirming that the injury suffered was a diffuse axonal injury and that Bianchi was in a critical but stable condition.

This data had been sourced from Bianchi's g-sensors in his earplugs; however, it was understood that these slipped out at a crucial moment.

According to Andy Mellor, Vice President of the FIA Safety Commission, this is the equivalent of "dropping a car  to the ground without a crumple zone".

Team and driver reactions
At the inaugural , one week after the accident, Marussia originally registered Alexander Rossi in place of the hospitalised Bianchi, before finally deciding to field only a single car driven by Max Chilton.

There were several tributes at the race to show support for Bianchi:

Marussia adopted a "#JB17" livery on the cockpit sides of its MR03 car (which continued to be used in the subsequent year).
Every driver wore a sticker on their helmet saying " #17" ("We're all with Jules #17"), being an idea championed by fellow French driver, Jean-Éric Vergne.
The drivers held a one-minute silence in honour of Bianchi just before the next race.
The race winner, Lewis Hamilton, dedicated his win to Bianchi.

Following the Russian Grand Prix, Marussia's CEO Graeme Lowdon confirmed that the team would return to a two-car operation for the remainder of the season, however, the team entered administration prior to the next race, the United States Grand Prix. The team's financial backer, Andrei Cheglakov, later revealed that Bianchi's crash was a key factor in the Russian's decision to end his financial support of the team and quit Formula One.

After the 2015 Australian Grand Prix in March, John Booth, now team principal of the newly established Manor Marussia F1 team, paid tribute to Bianchi's point performance at the 2014 Monaco Grand Prix since the prize money won enabled the team to stay in Formula One.

FIA reaction and investigation
Following Bianchi's accident, the FIA began an investigation and also considered appropriate changes to safety procedures, such as those at the Brazilian Grand Prix, where the location of a tractor crane serving the Senna S chicane was altered.

The FIA released its initial findings at a special conference held during the inaugural Russian Grand Prix on the Saturday after the Japanese Grand Prix weekend. Among other things, it was revealed that Bianchi had slowed down at Suzuka's Turn 7 but without disclosing by what margin or the speed of impact, and that the journey to the hospital by ambulance took only an extra 37 minutes relative to the helicopter, without any adverse effects on Bianchi's condition.

Further, the FIA confirmed ongoing research into closed cockpits for Formula One cars, the possibility of fitting protective skirting to all recovery vehicles as well as ways to slow down cars in crash zones more effectively than double yellow flags. With respect to the latter, the FIA moved to quickly consider the introduction of a virtual safety car – or VSC system – which was then tested during the season's final three Grands Prix in the United States, Brazil and Abu Dhabi – based on a Le Mans racing "slow zone" arrangement that does not neutralise race proceedings as much as safety car periods.

The following week, the FIA reportedly emailed all teams to request that they retain any information related to Bianchi's Suzuka accident, for exclusive use by an accident panel established by the FIA to investigate Bianchi's accident.

One week later the FIA announced a review panel to investigate the cause of the accident, which was made up of former drivers and team principals, and published its findings four weeks later. The report found that there was no single cause of Bianchi's accident. Instead, the contributing factors were found to include track conditions, car speed and the presence of a recovery vehicle on the circuit. The report also made several suggestions to improve safety when recovering stricken vehicles — which were subsequently introduced for the 2015 season — before concluding that it would not have been possible to mitigate Bianchi's injuries through changes to the cockpit design. The report also revealed that Bianchi pressed both the throttle and brake which should shut off power to the engine. However, Marussia's uniquely designed brake-by-wire system was found to be incompatible with the FailSafe so the engine was not shut off. Despite this, Marussia was not found to be responsible for the accident.

For the 2015 season, on safety grounds, the FIA also implemented measures requiring that no race can start less than 4 hours before sunset or dusk, except in the case of official night races. The revised regulations affected the start time of Australian, Malaysian, Chinese, Japanese and Russian Grands Prix.

In July 2015, Peter Wright, the Chairman of the FIA Safety Commission was quoted as saying that a closed cockpit would not have averted Bianchi's head injuries, while the Vice President, Andy Mellow, also confirmed that attaching impact protection to recovery vehicles was not a feasible solution.

Medical treatment and updates
The first family update following Bianchi's emergency surgery was made by his father in the week beginning 13 October 2014. Bianchi was reported to be in a "desperate" condition, with doctors describing his survival as a miracle. Even so, the father openly stated that he drew hope from Michael Schumacher waking from his coma.  Marussia also issued regular updates on Bianchi's condition while rejecting initial speculation about their role in the accident.

While hospitalised in Yokkaichi, Bianchi remained in a critical but stable condition, and required a medical ventilator. He was taken out of his artificial coma in November 2014 and began breathing unaided, making his relocation to France for admission at the Centre Hospitalier Universitaire de Nice (CHU), possible. There, Bianchi remained unconscious and in a critical condition but more accessible to his family for their daily vigil. On 13 July 2015, Bianchi's father publicly conceded becoming "less optimistic" as a consequence of no significant progress and the lapse of time since the accident.

Death

Bianchi died on 17 July 2015, aged 25, from injuries sustained at the time of his accident in Suzuka nine months earlier. His death made him the first Formula One driver to be killed by injuries sustained during a Grand Prix since Ayrton Senna in 1994.

In their official statement, Bianchi's family said:

The funeral service was held at the Nice Cathedral, on 21 July 2015. He was subsequently cremated and his ashes rest at Monte Carlo Cemetery and partially floated into the Mediterranean Sea. Many current, former, and future drivers attended Bianchi's funeral, including Alexander Wurz, Esteban Gutiérrez, Allan McNish, Alexander Rossi, Lewis Hamilton, Charles Leclerc, Nico Rosberg, Jenson Button, Sebastian Vettel, Jean-Éric Vergne, Marcus Ericsson, Roberto Merhi, Adrian Sutil, Valtteri Bottas, Pastor Maldonado, Pedro de la Rosa, Romain Grosjean, Daniel Ricciardo, Felipe Massa, Alain Prost, Nico Hülkenberg, Olivier Panis, Daniil Kvyat, and Max Chilton.

In May 2016 it was announced that Bianchi's family plans to take legal action against the FIA, Bianchi's Marussia team, and Bernie Ecclestone's Formula One Group.

Tributes
Widespread tributes followed from fellow past and present drivers, Bernie Ecclestone, French president François Hollande, and other sport personalities. The Manor Marussia team also published a statement on their Facebook page describing Bianchi as, among other things, "a magnificent human being" and a "shining talent".

The Grand Prix Drivers' Association announced that it felt a responsibility "to never relent in improving safety". FIA President Jean Todt also announced that race number 17 would be retired from the list of those available for Formula One drivers, as a mark of respect.

In paying his respects, di Montezemolo also stated that, thanks to GP2 experience and fine performance with Marussia and in test sessions, Bianchi was the racing driver that Scuderia Ferrari had chosen for the future even being described as a would-be replacement for Kimi Räikkönen.

Chilton dedicated his maiden Indy Lights pole position and race win, which he scored on the same weekend as Bianchi's death, to his former Marussia teammate.

Commemorative stickers on helmets and cars were other tributes at that race. Race winner, Sebastian Vettel of Ferrari, dedicated his maiden Hungarian win to Bianchi and his family, acknowledging that the Frenchman would have been part of the team in the future. Daniil Kvyat also dedicated his maiden podium finish as did third-placed finisher, Daniel Ricciardo.

The Rue du Sapin, the street address of the Allianz Riviera football stadium, was renamed in Bianchi's honour in 2016.

Charles Leclerc (Bianchi's godson) wore a tribute helmet to Bianchi and Leclerc's father, Herve at the 2019 Monaco Grand Prix with the design of Bianchi's helmet on one side, and his father's on the other side.

At the 2020 Bahrain Grand Prix, Romain Grosjean was involved in a major accident which saw his car break in half and catch fire. Grosjean credited the safety changes brought on by Bianchi's fatal crash with saving his life.

Foundation
In December 2015, Bianchi's father announced plans to create a foundation in his son's honour to uncover and nurture young drivers throughout their career. The initiative involves exhibiting Jules Bianchi's memorabilia (from go-karts and single-seaters to personal pictures and videos) and merchandising with JB17 branding, sponsoring opportunities and events. Among the supporters is Prince Albert of Monaco, where the foundation is based.

Racing record

Career summary

 Bianchi was a guest driver, therefore ineligible to score points.

Complete Formula 3 Euro Series results
(key) (Races in bold indicate pole position; races in italics indicate fastest lap)

Complete Formula Renault 3.5 Series results
(key) (Races in bold indicate pole position; races in italics indicate fastest lap)

Complete GP2 results
(key) (Races in bold indicate pole position; races in italics indicate fastest lap)

Complete GP2 Asia Series results
(key) (Races in bold indicate pole position; races in italics indicate fastest lap)

Complete Formula One results
(key) (Races in bold indicate pole position; races in italics indicates fastest lap)

 Driver did not finish the Grand Prix, but was classified as he completed over 90% of the race distance.

References

External links

Jules Bianchi Society 

1989 births
2015 deaths
Sportspeople from Nice
French racing drivers
French Formula One drivers
French Formula Renault 2.0 drivers
Formula Renault Eurocup drivers
Formula 3 Euro Series drivers
Formula 3 Euro Series champions
British Formula Three Championship drivers
GP2 Asia Series drivers
French people of Belgian descent
French sportspeople of Italian descent
GP2 Series drivers
World Series Formula V8 3.5 drivers
Marussia Formula One drivers
People with disorders of consciousness
People with severe brain damage
French people of Lombard descent
Manor Motorsport drivers
SG Formula drivers
ART Grand Prix drivers
Tech 1 Racing drivers
Karting World Championship drivers
Racing drivers who died while racing